The rhythmic gymnastics competitions at the 2018 Mediterranean Games took place between 29 and 30 June at the Pavelló Olímpic de Reus in Reus.

Athletes competed in 1 event, women's individual all-around.

Medal summary

Participating nations
Eleven nations have applied to compete in rhythmic gymnastics.

References

External links
2018 Mediterranean Games – Rhythmic gymnastics

Sports at the 2018 Mediterranean Games
Gymnastics at the Mediterranean Games
Mediterranean Games